The Washington Street Elevated was an elevated segment of Boston's Massachusetts Bay Transportation Authority subway system, comprising the southern stretch of the Orange Line.  It ran from Chinatown through the South End and Roxbury, ending in Forest Hills in Jamaica Plain, Boston.

History

Construction
The initial section of the Main Line Elevated opened on June 10, 1901, running from Sullivan Square in Charlestown over the Charlestown Elevated, through the Canal Street incline into the Tremont Street subway, and out the Pleasant Street portal onto the Washington Street Elevated. The Atlantic Avenue Elevated opened on August 22 of that year, joining the Washington Street El at Tower D Junction.

The El, Boston's first heavy rail metro line, proved extremely popular. The Washington Street Tunnel was opened on November 30, 1908,  providing a separate route for the Main Line and allowing use of the Tremont Street subway for through streetcars. The southern portal of the tunnel connected with the elevated at Tower D. The elevated was extended south to Forest Hills on November 22, 1909, with an intermediate station at Egleston to transfer passengers from streetcars serving Roxbury and Dorchester. Although the elevated was built primarily to replace radial streetcar lines running to downtown, ridership from the areas surrounding the stations proved high, and an infill station at Green Street with fewer streetcar connections was opened on September 22, 1912.

Replacement
The Washington Street Elevated was the last elevated section of the Orange Line to remain standing. The Atlantic Avenue Elevated ended service in 1938, while the Charlestown Elevated was replaced with the largely surface-level Haymarket North Extension in 1975.

By the 1980s, however, the elevated was showing its age. The steel uprights had lost a substantial portion of their mass to rusting, though it was not structurally unsound since it was heavily overbuilt, and a $3 million repainting in 1975 stopped further oxidation. 

From 1979 to 1987, the four-track railroad embankment between Back Bay and Forest Hills, originally acquired for a cancelled highway project, was converted to a trench with three mainline tracks and two rapid transit tracks as the Southwest Corridor project. Addition of rapid transit to the corridor had been proposed as a branch of the predecessor BERy's streetcar network in 1926, and as a relocation of the Orange Line since 1966. The last service over the Washington Street Elevated ran on April 30, 1987; service began over the Southwest Corridor route on May 4. The elevated was removed soon after; some of the steel was later used for a new bridge carrying Arizona Route 188 over Theodore Roosevelt Lake.

The closing of the Washington Street Elevated prompted a 2012 review, the Roxbury-Dorcester-Mattapan Transit Needs Study, recommended for some form of proposed replacement rail service to access southern Metro Boston neighborhoods - one option being studied within this review would re-use the Tremont Street subway's now-unused southern Pleasant Street tunnel coming from the Green Line's Boylston station. The new light rail service proposed in the 2012 review, to replace the rapid transit access the elevated previously provided, could go as far south as the Red Line's Mattapan station (via Nubian station), with a northern turnaround terminus at Government Center.

Silver Line

Since the Southwest Corridor was located somewhat further to the west than the elevated had been, away from neighborhood centers like Dudley and Egleston Squares, the MBTA promised that a branch of the light rail Green Line would be built to provide continued rapid transit service to those areas.  However, such service was not forthcoming; instead, the 49 Northampton – Washington & Kneeland feeder bus route was extended to Dudley Square and given a more direct routing.

In 2002, the MBTA deployed bus rapid transit along much of the route from Dudley Square to Downtown Crossing in the form of Phase I of the controversial Silver Line, replacing the 49. Although branded as bus rapid transit, the Washington Street section of the Silver Line is generally considered short of the international BRT Standard, as it lacks bus rapid transit elements such as dedicated bus lanes and pre-pay stations. The Silver Line has also been subject to neighborhood criticism, as it makes fewer stops than the 49, but nevertheless fails to sufficiently decrease travel times as compared to the previous conventional bus service.

The 2003 Program for Mass Transportation considered the possibility of converting the Washington Street section of the Silver Line to light rail, as had originally been promised, by using the abandoned Pleasant Street incline and the currently-unused southern segment of the Tremont Street subway to connect with the Green Line at  station.  However, the Phase III tunnel and continued bus service was recommended instead. In 2012, the aforementioned Roxbury-Dorcester-Mattapan Transit Needs Study recommended, as a long-term project, the light rail conversion of the Silver Line's Washington Street section and its connection to the Green Line via the abandoned tunnel with a northern terminus/turnaround for the new line at Government Center; with the additional possibility of extending the line down Blue Hill Avenue to  station (and thus connecting with the Ashmont–Mattapan High Speed Line, and, indirectly, with the Red Line), following the route currently taken by the #28 bus.

Stations

The Washington Street Elevated consisted of six stations, the most complex and major of which were at Dudley Square and Forest Hills.  Most of the original stations were designed by architect Alexander Wadsworth Longfellow, Jr., and originally featured much in the way of ornamentation and architectural prowess.  By the time the "El" closed, however, much of this detail had been lost to decades of decay, neglect, and cost-cutting.  Forest Hills Station was designed by Edmund March Wheelwright and was quite different from the other stations along the line, featuring a square stone exterior rather than sloping rooflines.

Following the closure of the elevated, most of the stations were scrapped; however, the Northampton station headhouse was moved to the Seashore Trolley Museum in Kennebunkport, Maine in 1988, where it remains today, and parts of  station were saved and incorporated into the current bus station.

The stations themselves were:

References

External links

Photos of the old Main Line Elevated
Text on and illustrations of old Main Line Elevated
Historic American Engineering Record entry
Video of outbound Orange Line train on the Washington Street Elevated
Conservation of Matter: The Fall and Rise of Boston’s Elevated Subway

Orange Line (MBTA)
Railway lines opened in 1901
Railway lines closed in 1987